Agdistis omani is a moth of the family Pterophoridae. It is found in Oman.

References
 , 2008, Pterophoridae aus dem Oman mit der beschreibung einer neuen Agdistis (Lepidoptera). Zeitschrift der Arbeitsgemeinschaft Oesterreichischer Entomologen 60 (2): 81-86

Moths described in 2008
Agdistinae
Moths of the Arabian Peninsula